The 2002–03 New Jersey Devils season was the 29th season for the National Hockey League franchise that was established on June 11, 1974, and 21st season since the franchise relocated from Colorado prior to the 1982–83 NHL season. After claiming the Atlantic Division and Eastern Conference titles, the Devils won their third Stanley Cup championship in a seven-game series against the Mighty Ducks of Anaheim.

In addition to the Devils reaching the Stanley Cup Finals, the other New Jersey team from one of the major professional sports leagues, the New Jersey Nets of the National Basketball Association (NBA), have reached the NBA Finals where they lost in six games to the San Antonio Spurs.

Regular season
The Devils tied the Philadelphia Flyers for fewest goals allowed (166) and had the fewest power-play opportunities against (264), the fewest power-play goals against (32) and the best penalty-kill percentage (87.88%). The Devils also tied the Detroit Red Wings, Los Angeles Kings and Washington Capitals for fewest short-handed goals allowed, with four. Furthermore, the Devils also had the fewest power-play opportunities for (303), the fewest power-play goals for (36) and the lowest power-play percentage, at 11.88%.

 January 17, 2003: Joe Nieuwendyk scored his 500th career goal against the Carolina Hurricanes in a 2–1 Devils victory. He then recorded his 1,000th career point on February 23 in a win over the Pittsburgh Penguins.

Season standings

Playoffs

Eastern Conference Quarterfinals 
The series opened at Continental Airlines Arena in New Jersey, and game one was a defensive battle in an ultimate 2–1 Devils victory behind two goals from Jamie Langenbrunner. New Jersey then took control of the series with a 4–2 victory in Game 2.

Down 2–0 in the series but heading home to FleetCenter, Boston shook things up, replacing Steve Shields, who allowed six goals in the first two games, in favor of Jeff Hackett. The shakeup did not do much, as the Devils shut out in the Bruins in Game 3, 3–0, with goalie Martin Brodeur stopping all 29 shots he faced. In game 4, Ken Daneyko was a healthy scratch and did not play that game. It was the first time in his career that he was a healthy scratch in the playoffs. Not wanting to end their season with a winless postseason and a loss in front of their fans, Boston came out firing by winning the game, 5–1 and knocking out Brodeur after the fifth goal in favor of Corey Schwab, who went six-for-six in net.

Unfortunately for the Bruins and their fans, they had only "stayed their execution" until game five in New Jersey, where Brodeur bounced back from his horrid Game 4 with a 28-save shutout in a 3–0 win as Langenbrunner added two more goals.

Eastern Conference semifinals
The series opened at Continental Airlines Arena in New Jersey, where the Devils scored three third-period goals to break a scoreless tie en route to a 3–0 game one victory with goalie Martin Brodeur posting a 15-save shutout in the process. Game two was a little tenser, with New Jersey rallying from a third-period deficit and winning the game 2:09 into overtime, 3–2, on a goal by Jamie Langenbrunner.

In game three at St. Pete Times Forum in Tampa, the Lightning jumped out to a 3–0 first-period lead. Then, Scott Stevens was injured by a puck that hit him in the face from a slapshot by Pavel Kubina. Following that, New Jersey tied the score before scoring in the third period on a goal by Dave Andreychuk to win the game, 4–3 for Tampa. Stevens recovered and returned for game four, and the Devils responded by winning, 3–1, to push the Lightning to the brink. The Devils ended the series with a 2–1 triple-overtime victory in game five, with Grant Marshall scoring the game-winning goal 11:12 into the sixth period.

Eastern Conference finals
The series opened at Corel Centre in Ottawa, where the Senators took game one in overtime, 3–2, when Shaun Van Allen tipped in a pass from Martin Havlát 3:08 into overtime. New Jersey tied the series, 1–1, with a crucial victory in game two, 4–1. It marked the first time Ottawa goalie Patrick Lalime allowed more than two goals in twelve postseason games.

Game three at the Continental Airlines Arena in New Jersey saw an amazing defensive battle, but New Jersey won the game, 1–0, on a first-period goal by Sergei Brylin. Martin Brodeur posted a 24-save shutout for the Devils in the process. New Jersey appeared to have the series in control when they broke a 2–2 tie in game four with three third-period goals en route to a 5–2 win, and they led in the series, 3–1. But, it wasn't over yet, as Minnesota (twice) and Vancouver rebounded from 3–1 series deficits earlier in the playoffs.

Ottawa returned home for game five, not wanting to lose in front of their fans. They staved off elimination with a 3–1 victory. The tense action resumed back in New Jersey for game six, as the teams entered overtime tied, 1–1, and all the Devils needed was a goal to knock out the Senators. The death blow did not come in game six, as Chris Phillips scored the game-winning goal 15:52 into overtime in the 2–1 Senators victory. This would be the Devils only home loss of the playoffs.

Determined not to suffer the same misfortunes as Colorado, St. Louis, and Vancouver, the Devils broke through in game seven, winning the game, 3–2, as Jeff Friesen knocked in the series-winning goal with just over two minutes to play to send New Jersey to the Stanley Cup Finals. In the decisive game, the Devils benefited from a two-goal performance by Jamie Langenbrunner, his first goals of the series.

Stanley Cup Finals 

For the Devils, this was their fourth Stanley Cup Finals appearance, after making the Finals previously in 1995, 2000, and 2001. As for the Mighty Ducks, it was their first ever Stanley Cup Finals appearance in franchise history after defeating the Detroit Red Wings, Dallas Stars, and Minnesota Wild. The Devils had a strong start in game one at the Meadowlands as they shut out the Ducks 3–0. Game two was pretty much Deja Vu for the Devils as they once again blanked the Ducks 3–0. Down 2–0 in the series, the Ducks responded at home in Anaheim with a 3–2 overtime victory. Then, in game four, Anaheim tied the series at two in a 1–0 overtime win. Back at the Meadowlands, game five was much more competitive and high tempo. While both teams went back and forth with three goals each, the Devils would add three more goals to win 6–3. Facing elimination in game six, the Ducks did not disappoint their fans as they won game six 5–2. However, during that game, Scott Stevens laid a vicious check on Paul Kariya, knocking him to the ground. Kariya quickly recovered and scored the game-winning goal, tying the series at three games apiece. The Devils ended the series with an exclamation mark as they shut out the Ducks 3–0 once more to capture their third Stanley Cup championship in nine seasons. While the Devils did win the cup, Jean-Sébastien Giguère of Anaheim won the Conn Smythe Trophy, making it the first time in sixteen years that a player from the losing team won the Conn Smythe Trophy.

Schedule and results

Preseason

|- align="center"
|1
|T
|September 20, 2002
| 4–4
|Pittsburgh Penguins
|0–0–1
|- align="center" bgcolor="#CCFFCC" 
|2
|W
|September 21, 2002
|5–1
|@ Philadelphia Flyers
|1–0–1
|- align="center" bgcolor="#FFBBBB"
|3
|L
|September 22, 2002
|3–4
|@ Pittsburgh Penguins
|1–1–1
|- align="center" bgcolor="#CCFFCC" 
|4
|W
|September 24, 2002
|2–1 OT
|@ New York Rangers
|2–1–1
|- align="center" bgcolor="#CCFFCC" 
|5
|W
|September 26, 2002
|4–0
|Philadelphia Flyers
|3–1–1
|- align="center"
|6
|T
|September 27, 2002
|2–2
|New York Rangers
|3–1–2
|- align="center" bgcolor="#FFBBBB"
|7
|L
|October 1, 2002
|2–5
|@ New York Islanders
|3–2–2
|- align="center" bgcolor="#FFBBBB"
|8
|L
|October 5, 2002
|1–3
|New York Islanders
|3–3–2
|-

|-
| Legend:

Regular season

|- align="center" bgcolor="#CCFFCC" 
|1||W||October 10, 2002||2–1 || align="left"| @ Ottawa Senators (2002–03) ||1–0–0–0||2 || 
|- align="center" bgcolor="#CCFFCC" 
|2||W||October 12, 2002||3–2 || align="left"|  Columbus Blue Jackets (2002–03) ||2–0–0–0||4 || 
|- align="center" bgcolor="#CCFFCC" 
|3||W||October 18, 2002||3–2 OT|| align="left"|  Nashville Predators (2002–03) ||3–0–0–0||6 || 
|- align="center" bgcolor="#FFBBBB"
|4||L||October 19, 2002||1–3 || align="left"| @ Carolina Hurricanes (2002–03) ||3–1–0–0||6 || 
|- align="center" bgcolor="#CCFFCC" 
|5||W||October 23, 2002||2–1 || align="left"| @ Atlanta Thrashers (2002–03) ||4–1–0–0||8 || 
|- align="center" bgcolor="#CCFFCC" 
|6||W||October 25, 2002||2–1 || align="left"| @ Buffalo Sabres (2002–03) ||5–1–0–0||10 || 
|- align="center" bgcolor="#CCFFCC" 
|7||W||October 26, 2002||5–1 || align="left"|  Tampa Bay Lightning (2002–03) ||6–1–0–0||12 || 
|- align="center" bgcolor="#FFBBBB"
|8||L||October 29, 2002||1–2 || align="left"|  Carolina Hurricanes (2002–03) ||6–2–0–0||12 || 
|-

|- align="center" bgcolor="#CCFFCC" 
|9||W||November 2, 2002||5–1 || align="left"|  Chicago Blackhawks (2002–03) ||7–2–0–0||14 || 
|- align="center" bgcolor="#FFBBBB"
|10||L||November 5, 2002||2–3 || align="left"|  Calgary Flames (2002–03) ||7–3–0–0||14 || 
|- align="center" bgcolor="#CCFFCC" 
|11||W||November 7, 2002||1–0 || align="left"| @ Philadelphia Flyers (2002–03) ||8–3–0–0||16 || 
|- align="center" bgcolor="#FFBBBB"
|12||L||November 9, 2002||3–6 || align="left"|  Edmonton Oilers (2002–03) ||8–4–0–0||16 || 
|- align="center" bgcolor="#CCFFCC" 
|13||W||November 12, 2002||3–2 OT|| align="left"|  Mighty Ducks of Anaheim (2002–03) ||9–4–0–0||18 || 
|- align="center" bgcolor="#CCFFCC" 
|14||W||November 15, 2002||5–1 || align="left"|  Montreal Canadiens (2002–03) ||10–4–0–0||20 || 
|- align="center" bgcolor="#FFBBBB"
|15||L||November 16, 2002||1–3 || align="left"| @ Montreal Canadiens (2002–03) ||10–5–0–0||20 || 
|- align="center" bgcolor="#CCFFCC" 
|16||W||November 19, 2002||4–3 OT|| align="left"|  Buffalo Sabres (2002–03) ||11–5–0–0||22 || 
|- align="center" 
|17||T||November 21, 2002||4–4 OT|| align="left"|  New York Rangers (2002–03) ||11–5–1–0||23 || 
|- align="center" bgcolor="#FFBBBB"
|18||L||November 23, 2002||1–3 || align="left"|  Tampa Bay Lightning (2002–03) ||11–6–1–0||23 || 
|- align="center" bgcolor="#FF6F6F"
|19||OTL||November 27, 2002||2–3 OT|| align="left"| @ Detroit Red Wings (2002–03) ||11–6–1–1||24 || 
|- align="center" bgcolor="#CCFFCC" 
|20||W||November 29, 2002||2–1 || align="left"| @ Nashville Predators (2002–03) ||12–6–1–1||26 || 
|- align="center" bgcolor="#CCFFCC" 
|21||W||November 30, 2002||5–4 OT|| align="left"| @ St. Louis Blues (2002–03) ||13–6–1–1||28 || 
|-

|- align="center" bgcolor="#CCFFCC" 
|22||W||December 2, 2002||1–0 OT|| align="left"| @ Philadelphia Flyers (2002–03) ||14–6–1–1||30 || 
|- align="center" bgcolor="#FF6F6F"
|23||OTL||December 4, 2002||2–3 OT|| align="left"|  Vancouver Canucks (2002–03) ||14–6–1–2||31 || 
|- align="center" bgcolor="#CCFFCC" 
|24||W||December 6, 2002||3–1 || align="left"|  Pittsburgh Penguins (2002–03) ||15–6–1–2||33 || 
|- align="center" bgcolor="#FFBBBB"
|25||L||December 7, 2002||0–1 || align="left"| @ Toronto Maple Leafs (2002–03) ||15–7–1–2||33 || 
|- align="center" bgcolor="#CCFFCC" 
|26||W||December 10, 2002||2–0 || align="left"|  St. Louis Blues (2002–03) ||16–7–1–2||35 || 
|- align="center" bgcolor="#FFBBBB"
|27||L||December 12, 2002||2–4 || align="left"| @ Columbus Blue Jackets (2002–03) ||16–8–1–2||35 || 
|- align="center" bgcolor="#FF6F6F"
|28||OTL||December 14, 2002||3–4 OT|| align="left"| @ Ottawa Senators (2002–03) ||16–8–1–3||36 || 
|- align="center" bgcolor="#FFBBBB"
|29||L||December 18, 2002||0–3 || align="left"|  Ottawa Senators (2002–03) ||16–9–1–3||36 || 
|- align="center" bgcolor="#CCFFCC" 
|30||W||December 19, 2002||3–1 || align="left"| @ Pittsburgh Penguins (2002–03) ||17–9–1–3||38 || 
|- align="center" bgcolor="#CCFFCC" 
|31||W||December 21, 2002||5–3 || align="left"|  Dallas Stars (2002–03) ||18–9–1–3||40 || 
|- align="center" 
|32||T||December 23, 2002||2–2 OT|| align="left"| @ New York Rangers (2002–03) ||18–9–2–3||41 || 
|- align="center" bgcolor="#FFBBBB"
|33||L||December 27, 2002||2–3 || align="left"| @ Washington Capitals (2002–03) ||18–10–2–3||41 || 
|- align="center" bgcolor="#CCFFCC" 
|34||W||December 28, 2002||2–1 OT|| align="left"|  Washington Capitals (2002–03) ||19–10–2–3||43 || 
|- align="center" bgcolor="#CCFFCC" 
|35||W||December 30, 2002||1–0 || align="left"| @ Boston Bruins (2002–03) ||20–10–2–3||45 || 
|-

|- align="center" bgcolor="#FFBBBB"
|36||L||January 1, 2003||1–2 || align="left"|  Florida Panthers (2002–03) ||20–11–2–3||45 || 
|- align="center" bgcolor="#CCFFCC" 
|37||W||January 3, 2003||2–0 || align="left"|  Toronto Maple Leafs (2002–03) ||21–11–2–3||47 || 
|- align="center" bgcolor="#FFBBBB"
|38||L||January 4, 2003||1–2 || align="left"| @ Toronto Maple Leafs (2002–03) ||21–12–2–3||47 || 
|- align="center" bgcolor="#CCFFCC" 
|39||W||January 7, 2003||3–2 || align="left"|  Montreal Canadiens (2002–03) ||22–12–2–3||49 || 
|- align="center" bgcolor="#CCFFCC" 
|40||W||January 10, 2003||2–1 || align="left"| @ Florida Panthers (2002–03) ||23–12–2–3||51 || 
|- align="center" 
|41||T||January 11, 2003||3–3 OT|| align="left"| @ Tampa Bay Lightning (2002–03) ||23–12–3–3||52 || 
|- align="center" bgcolor="#CCFFCC" 
|42||W||January 13, 2003||6–2 || align="left"|  Florida Panthers (2002–03) ||24–12–3–3||54 || 
|- align="center" bgcolor="#CCFFCC" 
|43||W||January 15, 2003||5–0 || align="left"|  New York Islanders (2002–03) ||25–12–3–3||56 || 
|- align="center" bgcolor="#CCFFCC" 
|44||W||January 17, 2003||2–1 || align="left"| @ Carolina Hurricanes (2002–03) ||26–12–3–3||58 || 
|- align="center" bgcolor="#CCFFCC" 
|45||W||January 18, 2003||5–2 || align="left"|  Carolina Hurricanes (2002–03) ||27–12–3–3||60 || 
|- align="center" bgcolor="#CCFFCC" 
|46||W||January 22, 2003||5–4 OT|| align="left"| @ San Jose Sharks (2002–03) ||28–12–3–3||62 || 
|- align="center" bgcolor="#CCFFCC" 
|47||W||January 24, 2003||3–1 || align="left"| @ Mighty Ducks of Anaheim (2002–03) ||29–12–3–3||64 || 
|- align="center" bgcolor="#FF6F6F"
|48||OTL||January 25, 2003||1–2 OT|| align="left"| @ Los Angeles Kings (2002–03) ||29–12–3–4||65 || 
|- align="center" bgcolor="#CCFFCC" 
|49||W||January 28, 2003||1–0 || align="left"|  Detroit Red Wings (2002–03) ||30–12–3–4||67 || 
|- align="center" bgcolor="#CCFFCC" 
|50||W||January 30, 2003||5–1 || align="left"|  Philadelphia Flyers (2002–03) ||31–12–3–4||69 || 
|-

|- align="center" bgcolor="#CCFFCC" 
|51||W||February 4, 2003||4–1 || align="left"|  Buffalo Sabres (2002–03) ||32–12–3–4||71 || 
|- align="center" bgcolor="#CCFFCC" 
|52||W||February 5, 2003||4–1 || align="left"| @ Washington Capitals (2002–03) ||33–12–3–4||73 || 
|- align="center" bgcolor="#FFBBBB"
|53||L||February 7, 2003||2–4 || align="left"|  Atlanta Thrashers (2002–03) ||33–13–3–4||73 || 
|- align="center" bgcolor="#CCFFCC" 
|54||W||February 9, 2003||3–2 || align="left"|  Minnesota Wild (2002–03) ||34–13–3–4||75 || 
|- align="center" bgcolor="#FFBBBB"
|55||L||February 11, 2003||1–3 || align="left"| @ Colorado Avalanche (2002–03) ||34–14–3–4||75 || 
|- align="center" bgcolor="#CCFFCC" 
|56||W||February 12, 2003||3–0 || align="left"| @ Phoenix Coyotes (2002–03) ||35–14–3–4||77 || 
|- align="center" bgcolor="#FFBBBB"
|57||L||February 15, 2003||1–4 || align="left"|  Pittsburgh Penguins (2002–03) ||35–15–3–4||77 || 
|- align="center" 
|58||T||February 18, 2003||2–2 OT|| align="left"| @ Philadelphia Flyers (2002–03) ||35–15–4–4||78 || 
|- align="center" bgcolor="#FFBBBB"
|59||L||February 19, 2003||3–5 || align="left"|Ottawa Senators (2002–03) ||35–16–4–4||78 || 
|- align="center" bgcolor="#CCFFCC" 
|60||W||February 21, 2003||3–2 || align="left"|  Boston Bruins (2002–03) ||36–16–4–4||80 || 
|- align="center" bgcolor="#CCFFCC" 
|61||W||February 23, 2003||4–3 || align="left"| @ Pittsburgh Penguins (2002–03) ||37–16–4–4||82 || 
|- align="center" 
|62||T||February 25, 2003||3–3 OT|| align="left"|  New York Rangers (2002–03) ||37–16–5–4||83 || 
|- align="center" 
|63||T||February 27, 2003||3–3 OT|| align="left"| @ New York Islanders (2002–03) ||37–16–6–4||84 || 
|-

|- align="center" bgcolor="#CCFFCC" 
|64||W||March 1, 2003||2–1 OT|| align="left"|  Washington Capitals (2002–03) ||38–16–6–4||86 || 
|- align="center" bgcolor="#FFBBBB"
|65||L||March 4, 2003||2–3 || align="left"| @ Minnesota Wild (2002–03) ||38–17–6–4||86 || 
|- align="center" bgcolor="#FF6F6F"
|66||OTL||March 5, 2003||4–5 OT|| align="left"| @ Calgary Flames (2002–03) ||38–17–6–5||87 || 
|- align="center" bgcolor="#CCFFCC" 
|67||W||March 8, 2003||4–2 || align="left"| @ New York Islanders (2002–03) ||39–17–6–5||89 || 
|- align="center" bgcolor="#FFBBBB"
|68||L||March 11, 2003||2–3 || align="left"|  Atlanta Thrashers (2002–03) ||39–18–6–5||89 || 
|- align="center" bgcolor="#FFBBBB"
|69||L||March 13, 2003||3–4 || align="left"| @ Boston Bruins (2002–03) ||39–19–6–5||89 || 
|- align="center" bgcolor="#CCFFCC" 
|70||W||March 15, 2003||3–1 || align="left"|  New York Rangers (2002–03) ||40–19–6–5||91 || 
|- align="center" bgcolor="#FFBBBB"
|71||L||March 17, 2003||2–4 || align="left"|  Philadelphia Flyers (2002–03) ||40–20–6–5||91 || 
|- align="center" bgcolor="#CCFFCC" 
|72||W||March 18, 2003||1–0 || align="left"| @ Montreal Canadiens (2002–03) ||41–20–6–5||93 || 
|- align="center" bgcolor="#CCFFCC" 
|73||W||March 21, 2003||3–1 || align="left"|  Pittsburgh Penguins (2002–03) ||42–20–6–5||95 || 
|- align="center" bgcolor="#CCFFCC" 
|74||W||March 22, 2003||4–2 || align="left"| @ New York Islanders (2002–03) ||43–20–6–5||97 || 
|- align="center" bgcolor="#CCFFCC" 
|75||W||March 24, 2003||4–1 || align="left"| @ Florida Panthers (2002–03) ||44–20–6–5||99 || 
|- align="center" 
|76||T||March 27, 2003||2–2 OT|| align="left"| @ Tampa Bay Lightning (2002–03) ||44–20–7–5||100 || 
|- align="center" 
|77||T||March 28, 2003||1–1 OT|| align="left"| @ Atlanta Thrashers (2002–03) ||44–20–8–5||101 || 
|- align="center" bgcolor="#CCFFCC" 
|78||W||March 30, 2003||6–0 || align="left"|  New York Islanders (2002–03) ||45–20–8–5||103 || 
|-

|- align="center" bgcolor="#FF6F6F"
|79||OTL||April 1, 2003||2–3 OT|| align="left"|  Toronto Maple Leafs (2002–03) ||45–20–8–6||104 || 
|- align="center" 
|80||T||April 3, 2003||1–1 OT|| align="left"|  Boston Bruins (2002–03) ||45–20–9–6||105 || 
|- align="center" bgcolor="#CCFFCC" 
|81||W||April 4, 2003||2–1 || align="left"| @ New York Rangers (2002–03) ||46–20–9–6||107 || 
|- align="center" 
|82||T||April 6, 2003||2–2 OT|| align="left"| @ Buffalo Sabres (2002–03) ||46–20–10–6||108 || 
|-

|-
| Legend:

Playoffs

|- align="center" bgcolor="#CCFFCC"
| 1 ||W|| April 9, 2003 || Boston Bruins || 2–1 || Devils lead 1–0 || 
|- align="center" bgcolor="#CCFFCC"
| 2 ||W|| April 11, 2003 || Boston Bruins || 4–2 || Devils lead 2–0 || 
|- align="center" bgcolor="#CCFFCC"
| 3 ||W|| April 13, 2003 || @ Boston Bruins || 3–0 || Devils lead 3–0 || 
|- align="center" bgcolor="#FFBBBB"
| 4 ||L|| April 15, 2003 || @ Boston Bruins || 1–5 || Devils lead 3–1 || 
|- align="center" bgcolor="#CCFFCC"
| 5 ||W|| April 17, 2003 || Boston Bruins || 3–0 || Devils win 4–1 || 
|-

|- align="center" bgcolor="#CCFFCC"
| 1 ||W|| April 24, 2003 || Tampa Bay Lightning || 3–0 || Devils lead 1–0 || 
|- align="center" bgcolor="#CCFFCC"
| 2 ||W|| April 26, 2003 || Tampa Bay Lightning || 3–2 OT || Devils lead 2–0 || 
|- align="center" bgcolor="#FFBBBB"
| 3 ||L|| April 28, 2003 || @ Tampa Bay Lightning || 3–4 || Devils lead 2–1 || 
|- align="center" bgcolor="#CCFFCC"
| 4 ||W|| April 30, 2003 || @ Tampa Bay Lightning || 3–1 || Devils lead 3–1 || 
|- align="center" bgcolor="#CCFFCC"
| 5 ||W|| May 2, 2003 || Tampa Bay Lightning || 2–1 3OT || Devils win 4–1 || 
|-

|- align="center" bgcolor="#FFBBBB"
| 1 ||L|| May 10, 2003 || @ Ottawa Senators || 2–3 OT || Senators lead 1–0 || 
|- align="center" bgcolor="#CCFFCC"
| 2 ||W|| May 13, 2003 || @ Ottawa Senators || 4–1 || Series tied 1–1 || 
|- align="center" bgcolor="#CCFFCC"
| 3 ||W|| May 15, 2003 || Ottawa Senators || 1–0 || Devils lead 2–1 || 
|- align="center" bgcolor="#CCFFCC"
| 4 ||W|| May 17, 2003 || Ottawa Senators || 5–2 || Devils lead 3–1 || 
|- align="center" bgcolor="#FFBBBB"
| 5 ||L|| May 19, 2003 || @ Ottawa Senators || 1–3 || Devils lead 3–2 || 
|- align="center" bgcolor="#FFBBBB"
| 6 ||L|| May 21, 2003 || Ottawa Senators || 1–2 OT || Series tied 3–3 || 
|- align="center" bgcolor="#CCFFCC"
| 7 ||W|| May 23, 2003 || @ Ottawa Senators || 3–2 || Devils win 4–3 || 
|-

|- align="center" bgcolor="#CCFFCC"
| 1 ||W|| May 27, 2003 || Anaheim Mighty Ducks || 3–0 || Devils lead 1–0 || 
|- align="center" bgcolor="#CCFFCC"
| 2 ||W|| May 29, 2003 || Anaheim Mighty Ducks || 3–0 || Devils lead 2–0 || 
|- align="center" bgcolor="#FFBBBB"
| 3 ||L|| May 31, 2003 || @ Anaheim Mighty Ducks || 2–3 OT || Devils lead 2–1 || 
|- align="center" bgcolor="#FFBBBB"
| 4 ||L|| June 2, 2003 || @ Anaheim Mighty Ducks || 0–1 OT || Series tied 2–2 || 
|- align="center" bgcolor="#CCFFCC"
| 5 ||W|| June 5, 2003 || Anaheim Mighty Ducks || 6–3 || Devils lead 3–2 || 
|- align="center" bgcolor="#FFBBBB"
| 6 ||L|| June 7, 2003 || @ Anaheim Mighty Ducks || 2–5 || Series tied 3–3 || 
|- align="center" bgcolor="#CCFFCC"
| 7 ||W|| June 9, 2003 || Anaheim Mighty Ducks || 3–0 || Devils win 4–3 || 
|-

|-
| Legend:

Player statistics

Scoring
 Position abbreviations: C = Center; D = Defense; G = Goaltender; LW = Left Wing; RW = Right Wing
  = Joined team via a transaction (e.g., trade, waivers, signing) during the season. Stats reflect time with the Devils only.
  = Left team via a transaction (e.g., trade, waivers, release) during the season. Stats reflect time with the Devils only.

Goaltending

Awards and records

Awards
Martin Brodeur was also a finalist for the Hart Memorial Trophy and John Madden was runner-up for the Frank J. Selke Trophy.

Milestones

Transactions
The Devils were involved in the following transactions from June 14, 2002, the day after the deciding game of the 2002 Stanley Cup Finals, through June 9, 2003, the day of the deciding game of the 2003 Stanley Cup Finals.

Trades

Players acquired

Players lost

Signings

Draft picks
The Devils' draft picks at the 2002 NHL Entry Draft at the Air Canada Centre in Toronto, Ontario.

Media
Television coverage was carried on Fox Sports Net New York with Mike Emrick and Chico Resch with the play-by-play calling while Matt Loughlin served as the color commentator. The radio broadcasts were on WABC–AM 770, with John Hennessy handling the play-by-play duties with Randy Velischek color commentating.

See also
2002–03 NHL season

Notes

References

New Jersey Devils seasons
New Jersey Devils
New Jersey Devils
New Jersey Devils
New Jersey Devils
21st century in East Rutherford, New Jersey
Eastern Conference (NHL) championship seasons
Meadowlands Sports Complex
Stanley Cup championship seasons